The Trust Project is a complex international consortium involving approximately 120 news organizations working towards greater transparency and accountability in the global news industry, including The Economist, Folha de São Paulo, The Globe and Mail, the Independent Journal Review, Mic, Italy's La Repubblica, Il Sole 24 Ore, and La Stampa. The Project was started in 2014 by Sally Lehrman, a journalist and former director of Santa Clara University's journalism ethics program at the Markkula Center for Applied Ethics and launched in November 2017. Richard Gingras, head of Google News is a co-founder. The Project is funded by Craigslist founder Craig Newmark’s Philanthropic Fund, Google, the John S. and James L. Knight Foundation, the Democracy Fund, the Markkula Foundation and Facebook.

Mandate
The Trust Project was created to "strengthen public confidence in the news through accountability and transparency". It is a consortium of news companies working collectively to develop and implement transparency standards that for users can see and machines can read in order to increase accountability in journalism.

Consortium members

The consortium includes 120 members such as The Economist, The Washington Post, Germany's Deutsche Presse-Agentur (DPA), The Globe and Mail, the Independent Journal Review (IJR), Mic, Italy's La Repubblica, La Stampa, Bay Area News Group, CBC News, Heavy.com, Sky News, The Toronto Star, TEGNA, Voice of OC, Italy's Corriere della Sera and Il Sole 24 Ore, Spain's El Pais, Greece's Kathimerini, and Haymarket Media Group. Members work closely with the Trust Project to display the required Trust Indicators, implement associated markup, and have the right to use the Trust Mark logo.

Core Trust Indicators and editorial attributes
The consortium "has created a set of digital standards called "Trust Indicators" to help identify and surface high quality reporting from reliable news sites." According to the Trust Project, "Trust Indicators" are markings within published news articles that denote to readers the news websites' commitment to increased journalistic and ethical standards in reporting. The Trust Project's transparency standards are intended to assist journalists to "serve society with a truthful, intelligent and comprehensive account of events and ideas."

The consortium has created its own content management system (CMS), editorial guidelines, and style guide. These reflect the consortium's shared principles through policies on ethics, corrections, anonymous sourcing, and fact-checking standards. News articles use markup language, user experience (UX) as "pieces of online code to deliver improved search and news results" by providing readers with information including the author/journalist and how the story was reported.

Background
According to an October 25, 2014 article by Jeff Jarvis published in Medium, Richard Gingras, head of Google News, and Sally Lehrman, had begun a campaign to build trust in the news through a "set of practical tactics". These included statements of mission and ethics crafted and published by news agencies, disclosure by journalists of their background regarding level of expertise and "areas of personal interest and conflict", full disclosure of all contributors to the content of an article including researchers, editors, and lawyers, the use of citations, footnotes, and corrections with links, and disclosure of their methodology including "whom they interviewed" and "what they researched". Gingras and Lehrman have been described as co-founders of The Trust Project. Gingras "oversees Google’s effort to enable a healthy, open ecosystem for quality journalism, which includes Accelerated Mobile Pages, Subscribe with Google, the Trust Project and various other efforts to provide tools for journalists and news providers."

Sally Lehrman, a journalist and former director of Santa Clara University's journalism ethics program at the Markkula Center for Applied Ethics, is the head of the Trust Project. In his February 2018 article, Dan Peleschuk wrote that The Trust Project officially had "been two years in the making" but was, in reality, the "culmination of many more years of professional self-reflection" on the part of Lehrman. Lehrman's interest in "accountability and public transparency" was inspired in part by the 1975 Asilomar Conference on Recombinant DNA, "when geneticists debated the potential dangers of biomedical research in an attempt to raise public awareness."

The pre-launch of the Trust Project was in April 2017 and the launch with the first group of publishers—The Economist, The Globe and Mail, the Independent Journal Review, Mic, Germany's Deutsche Presse-Agentur (DPA), Trinity Mirror, The Washington Post, Italy's La Repubblica, and La Stampa—took place in the November 2017.  Mic reported that their company had been working on a similar project prior to joining the consortium.

Following its November 2017 launch, Facebook, Google and Twitter, also began to deploy the new trust indicator symbols to "help assure users of the reliability of their content and combat fabricated stories".

On November 15, 2017, Twitter changed their verification methods under the Trust Project policies, and some white nationalists lost their blue checkmark.

Funding
The Project is funded by Craigslist founder Craig Newmark’s Philanthropic Fund, Google, the John S. and James L. Knight Foundation, the Democracy Fund, the Markkula Foundation and Facebook. Newmark said, "As a news consumer, I want news I can trust. I want to be able to read a piece of news and know who’s behind it, where the information comes from, and the reporting values of the news organization."

Response
According to The Mirror Group's January to March 2018 study undertaken by Reach plc readers trust rose by 8% "after adopting Trust Project indicators". In his 2014 article, Jeff Jarvis said that The Trust Project represented "a start" in rebuilding trust in "journalism, news, and media." Business Wire compared the Project's Trust Indicators to nutritional labels that consortium partners can use to "provide clarity on who and what is behind a news story so that people can easily assess whether it comes from a credible source." In the Knight Commission's 2019 report "Crisis in Democracy: Renewing Trust in America", the authors note that "[w]hile many news organizations have experimented with transparency initiatives, there are no standard best practices recognized across the industry." They recommended that U.S. news media leaders and an ongoing working group of experts from across the industry could identify and adopt common standards and best practices that promote transparency" by building on "newer efforts underway such as the Trust Project" among others.

Notes

References

External links 

 

Media analysis organizations and websites